Ioan Luchian Mihalea (b. 1951, Ocnele Mari – d. 29 November 1993, Bucharest) was a Romanian composer, conductor and television producer. He was the founder and leader of the vocal group Song and the children's choir Minisong. On 29 November 1993, Mihalea was murdered in his apartment in the Drumul Taberei neighborhood of Bucharest by Nelu Florian Gavrilă and Ionel Păun. The motive for the crime was robbery. The criminals were sentenced to life imprisonment. Mihalea is buried in Bellu cemetery, Bucharest.

Sources 

1951 births
1993 deaths
Romanian composers
Romanian conductors (music)
Male conductors (music)
Romanian murder victims
People murdered in Romania
Burials at Bellu Cemetery
People from Vâlcea County
Romanian gay musicians
Gay composers
20th-century conductors (music)
20th-century composers
20th-century Romanian male musicians
20th-century Romanian LGBT people